William H. Macy is an American actor, director and screenwriter who has received various awards and nominations, including two Primetime Emmy Awards, four Screen Actors Guild Awards, an Academy Award nomination, and five nominations at the Golden Globe Awards.

At the beginning of his career, he starred in small independent films like Homicide (1991) and Oleanna (1994) that earned him nominations at the Independent Spirit Awards. He rose to fame with the critically acclaimed 1996 thriller film Fargo, for which he received nominations for the Academy Award for Best Supporting Actor, the Screen Actors Guild Award for Outstanding Performance by a Male Actor in a Supporting Role, and a win for the Independent Spirit Award for Best Male Lead. He was nominated for the Screen Actors Guild Award for Outstanding Performance by a Cast in a Motion Picture four times, as part of the ensembles of the films Boogie Nights (1997), Magnolia (1999), Seabiscuit (2003) and Bobby (2006).

Macy wrote and starred in the television films Door to Door (2002) and The Wool Cap (2004). For the former, he won two Primetime Emmy Awards, Outstanding Lead Actor in a Limited Series or Movie and Outstanding Writing for a Limited Series or Movie, a Satellite Award and a Screen Actors Guild Award for Outstanding Performance by a Male Actor in a Miniseries or Television Movie, and he was nominated for the Golden Globe Award for Best Actor – Miniseries or Television Film for both.

From 2011 to 2021, Macy played Frank Gallagher in the comedy-drama series Shameless, for which he was nominated for six Primetime Emmy Awards for Outstanding Lead Actor in a Comedy Series, two Golden Globe Awards for Best Actor – Television Series Musical or Comedy, and he won the Screen Actors Guild Award for Outstanding Performance by a Male Actor in a Comedy Series three times.

Awards and nominations

Notes

References

External links 
  

Macy, William H.